is a single released by Gackt, on June 20, 2007, by Nippon Crown. It is Gackt's first single to top the Oricon Singles Chart, first by record label since Kaze's "22-Sai no Wakare" released in 1975, and the theme song for NHK drama Fūrin Kazan.

Summary
In 2006, Gackt continued his tour "Diabolos: Aien no Shi" with a concert on January 14, in Korea, at Fencing Stadium in Korean Olympic Park, which was his first Asian solo concert. In August at an Otakon conference, it was publicly announced that he would form a band S.K.I.N with the co-founder of the Japanese famous metal band X Japan, Yoshiki Hayashi, for which the idea origins in 2002. With the band still in formation, Gackt on December 24 went on a small nationwide fanclub rock tour "D.r.u.g. Party", which was also continued with four concerts in Korea and Taiwan. In January 2007, Gackt starred in the NHK Taiga drama Fūrin Kazan, where portrayed the warlord Uesugi Kenshin. Next week, after the single release, on June 29 was held the debut concert of S.K.I.N. at the Anime Expo in Long Beach, California, called the "Japanese rock concert of the century". Although there were high expectations by the public, and Gackt and Yoshiki themselves, all activities were suddenly stopped.

Release
The single was released in a regular and limited edition, which beside the title song also included two live recordings of previously published songs from D.r.u.g Party Tour, only the limited edition to come with the music video for the title song. The inspiration for the image used in this single ties into the NHK drama Fūrin Kazan, in which Gackt plays the warlord Uesugi Kenshin. Gackt performed the song live on the 58th Kōhaku Uta Gassen. 

The single topped the charts on the day it was released, on the initially counting week of July, with sales of 43,275 copies. In the upcoming week, it was at number nine, with sales of 11,257 copies. It charted for 11 weeks, and sold over 70,000 copies.

Music video
In the music video samurais are arriving and fighting at the battlefield, but the background behind this song is a woman waiting for the return of her lover from the battlefield, as Gackt sings the lyrics from the woman's perspective while playing the role of the husband in the video. The husband dies in the battle and never comes back. The armor of Gackt is the armor of Uesugi Kenshin used in the movie Heaven and Earth.

Track listing

Notes
"Returner" is Gackt's first single to reach the number one spot on the Japanese Oricon weekly charts.
The song was also used as the theme song for the Japanese release of the movie The Prestige.

References

2007 singles
Gackt songs
Oricon Weekly number-one singles

Songs written by Gackt
2007 songs